Abando, formerly known as San Vicente de Abando, is one of the eight districts of Bilbao, Basque Country (Spain). It covers most of the city's centre, located on the left bank of the estuary of Bilbao. It is the only district of Bilbao with all of its land completely urbanised. Abando was originally an elizate and also a municipality until 1876, when part of it was annexed to Bilbao, the rest of the elizate's municipal land was integrated into Bilbao in 1890. In 2016 the population was 50,903. Abando is the wealthiest district in Bilbao, with personal and family incomes being well above the citywide average.

History 

The exact moment of the foundation of Abando is unknown, as it is common with other elizates across Biscay. In the year 1300, the city of Bilbao was founded by Diego López V de Haro in the place of a small settlement at the right bank of the estuary. This settlement had its rights as a city confirmed by King Ferdinand V of Castile and its charter document included jurisdiction over the lands at the other side of the San Antón Bridge, an area then called Allende la Puente and today known as Bilbao la Vieja, which originally belonged to Abando.

During the 18th century Abando grew to be the most populous elizate of Biscay, with around 2,100 inhabitants. This population was distributed across several rural neighbourhoods composed mostly of farm houses (Basque: baserri). These neighbourhoods were Bilbao la Vieja, Ibarra, Mena-Urizar-Larrasquitu, Elejaberri, Olaveaga, Zorroza and Ibaizabal. In 1835, during the First Carlist War, the siege weapons and artillery used for the siege of Bilbao were stored in the sacristy of the San Vicente church of Abando.

The railroad arrived in 1863 with the opening of the rail line to Urduña. This railway was constructed to connect Bilbao and Biscay with Castile, and was eventually expanded to reach Castejón. This led to the establishment of the Bilbao-Tudela Railway Company, which constructed a terminus railway station in Abando, where the Irish Charles Blacker Vignoles worked as an engineer. The company was absorbed by the Compañía de los Caminos de Hierro del Norte (Northern Railways Company) in 1878 and the ownership of the railway station passed to them.

During the 19th century Bilbao had become congested and needed more land to grow in size, and in 1870 part of the land belonging to Abando was annexed to the city, with the objective of carrying out the construction of an ensanche (planned city expansion). The annexation of the entire elizate of Abando finally occurred in 1890. The ensanche project of Alzola, Achúcarro and Hoffmeyer architects was approved in 1876, Abando was to become the modern center of Bilbao, with wide straight boulevards in a grid layout, the main one being Gran Vía de Don Diego López de Haro, contrasting with the maze of narrow alleys of the Casco Viejo, the old town of Bilbao.

Sabino Arana, father of Basque nationalism and founder of the Basque Nationalist Party was born in Abando in 1865, when it was still a separate municipality.

Today the districts of Abando, Errekalde and Basurto are built in what was the old elizate of Abando. In recent years
the northern part of the district has been refurbished to create the new area of Abandoibarra (translated into Abando's shore), a vast formerly industrial area on the shore of the Estuary of Bilbao that now has been renewed and hosts the Guggenheim Bilbao Museum, Euskalduna Palace and many recreational and residential areas like the Isozaki Atea towers. The district is today the central financial and commercial area of Bilbao.

Geography 

Abando is located on the left bank of the estuary of Bilbao, in a large plain. Abando borders to the north with the estuary, across of which are located the districts of Uribarri and Deusto. To the east are the districts of Deusto and Basurto-Zorroza and to the south the districts of Errekalde and Ibaiondo, district which Abando also borders to the west. It covers an area of 2.14 square kilometres or 0.82 square miles.

Subdivisions 

Politically and administratively, the district of Abando is divided into two quarters (Basque: auzo), Abando and Indautxu.

Parks and gardens 

The district of Abando is home to many of the most centric green spaces of the city. The Doña Casilda Iturrizar park is one of the largest in the city, with around 8.5 hectares of green spaces and fountains. Across Abandoibarra many of the former industrial sites and shipyards were replaced with open and green spaces, many of which are located in the surroundings of the Guggenheim museum. They include the Plaza Euskadi, the Republic of Abando park and the riverbank park (Basque: Erribera parkea) by the river Bilbao. Other relevant parks and open spaces include the Albia gardens, the Moyua Plaza and the Birbila Plaza.

Demographics 

In 2017 Abando had a population of 51,622 people, out of which 15.6% were children under the age of 18, and 26% were 65 years old or older. In 2015 5.8% were immigrants.

Economy 

Abando is the economic centre of Bilbao. It acts as the central shopping and business district of the city, particularly in the surroundings of the Gran Vía de Don Diego López de Haro, which serves as the main avenue of the city. Alongside the many shops and business buildings, located in Abando are the headquarters of BBVA, a multinational banking group as well as Kutxabank. Also located in Abando are important commercial centres such as El Corte Inglés and Zubiarte. During the industrial period of the city and until the mid 1990s, the riverside area of Abando was home of the city docks and important ship construction companies, such as the now disappeared Euskalduna.

Transport 

Abando is the location of the Bilbao-Abando railway station, the largest train station in Bilbao, with long-distance passenger trains operated by Renfe to Galicia, Madrid and Barcelona as well as intercity services to Miranda de Ebro. Bilbao-Abando is also the terminus station for the commuter-rail network Cercanías Bilbao with frequent services to Santurtzi, Muskiz and Urduña. This station is also connected to the Bilbao tram services and Metro Bilbao lines one and two. Also located in Abando is the Bilbao-Concordia station, operated by Renfe Feve, with local services to Balmaseda and Karrantza as well as intercity services to Santander and León.

Metro Bilbao has three stations located in the district, which are Abando, Moyua and Indautxu, the three of which are served by line 1 and line 2. The tramway line operated by Euskotren Tranbia has seven stations in the district: Abando, Pío Baroja, Uribitarte, Guggenheim, Abandoibarra, Euskalduna and Sabino Arana. The district is served by numerous Bilbobus lines that connect Abando with other districts across the city, the main stops are located in Moyúa and in the Gran Vía by the Birbila Plaza. Also in Moyua and by the train station there are Bizkaibus stops that include direct services to Bilbao Airport and other municipalities across Biscay.

The district has seven bridges crossing the estuary of Bilbao and the main streets are the Gran Vía de Don Diego López de Haro, which is considered the main avenue of the city. It crosses the district transversally connecting the Biribila Plaza, where it intersects with the Hurtado de Amézaga street to Errekalde; the Moyua Plaza, intersecting there with the Recalde Boulevard to the Abandoibarra area; and the Sagrado Corazón Plaza, crossing there with the Sabino Arana Avenue towards Basurto-Zorroza and the Euskalduna Bridge to Deusto. Also relevant are the Abandoibarra Avenue by the estuary and the Urquijo Boulevard in the Indautxu area.

Sights

References

Districts of Bilbao